The 2nd Florida Cavalry Regiment was a Cavalry regiment from Florida that served in the Union Army between December 1863 and November 29, 1865, during the American Civil War.

Service 
Organized at Cedar Key and Key West, Florida between December 1863 and June 1864. Attached to District of Key West and Tortugas, Department of the Gulf and the Department of Florida to November 1865.

SERVICE – Duty at Fort Myers, Cedar Key and in District of Key West till June, 1865. Skirmishes at Pease Creek, Florida, February 13–14 and February 20, 1864. Attack on Fort Myers February 20. Affair at Tampa May 6. Operations on West Coast of Florida July 1–31. Expedition to Bayport, Florida July 1–4. Skirmishes at Station Four, near Cedar Key, July 6. Expedition to St. Andrews Bay July 20–29. Fort Myers August 26. Expedition to Bayport October 1, and to St. Andrews Bay October 20–29. Near Magnolia October 24. Expedition to Otter Creek, on Florida Railroad, October 30–31. Braddock's Farm, near Welaka, Florida, February 5, 1865. Station Four, near Cedar Key, February 13. Attack on Fort Myers February 20. Operations near St. Marks, Florida February 21 – March 7. East River Bridge March 4–5. Newport Bridge March 5–6. Natural Bridge (in Leon County, Florida) March 6. Occupation of Tampa May 27. Duty in District of Florida till November. Mustered out on November 29, 1865.

See also

List of Florida Union Civil War units

References

Bibliography 
 Dyer, Frederick H. (1959). A Compendium of the War of the Rebellion. New York and London. Thomas Yoseloff, Publisher. .

Units and formations of the Union Army from Florida
1863 establishments in Florida
Military units and formations established in 1863
Military units and formations disestablished in 1865